City Stadium is an American football stadium in Green Bay, Wisconsin, on the north side of the Green Bay East High School property.
It was the home of the Green Bay Packers of the NFL from 1925 through 1956. Renovated and downsized, City Stadium remains the home of East High. Prior to 1925, the Packers played home games at nearby Hagemeister Park (the site of East High School itself) and Bellevue Park.

History
The horseshoe-shaped stadium was made of wood and originally did not have any toilet facilities. It stood behind East High School and next to the East River. The Packers used the school for locker room facilities, but visiting teams often dressed at their hotel (usually the Hotel Northland) before the game rather than use the lockers at East High.  The stadium originally seated 6,000 and its capacity was gradually expanded to 25,000.  The Packers compiled a record of 88-41-7 at City Stadium, including NFL championship seasons in 1929, 1930, 1931, 1936, 1939, and 1944. However, City Stadium never hosted an NFL Championship Game. Of the four championship games the Packers played in during the years of City Stadium, the team hosted only one, the 1939 title game, which was played in Milwaukee instead.

Although City Stadium was the Packers' official home field, in 1933—during the worst of the Great Depression—they began to play part of their home schedule in Milwaukee.  After holding one contest at Borchert Field in 1933, the Packers played two or three home games each year in Milwaukee, at State Fair Park in West Allis from 1934 to 1951 and at Marquette Stadium in 1952. The games were moved to County Stadium after it opened in 1953. The practice continued through 1994, after which they were again based solely in Green Bay.

While its playing surface was consistently praised, by the 1950s the stadium was seen as too small and inadequate, even after expansion, which was limited by both natural and man-made factors, including both East High to the south and the East River on its north and east edges. The leaders of the NFL, including George Halas, gave the Packer board an ultimatum—build a new stadium or move to Milwaukee full-time.

The residents of Green Bay responded by approving (70.3%) a bond issue in April 1956 to build a new City Stadium, which opened the following year, as "old" City Stadium became a high school field. The new stadium was renamed Lambeau Field in August 1965, after the death of team founder Curly Lambeau, and has become one of the most revered venues in all of American sports.

After the Packers

In recent years, ornamental fencing and monuments to the history of the field have been erected.  Before the 2008 renovations, it was often referred to as East Stadium or Old City Stadium.

The 100th Green Bay East–West football game was played at City Stadium in 2005, with approximately 8,000 people attending the historic event. 
As an observance of the 50th anniversary of the opening of Lambeau Field, the Packers held practice at City Stadium on July 31, 2007. 

In the summer of 2008, City Stadium was renovated with a new press box, new bleachers on the home side of the field, and two new football goal posts. Much of the structure had dated to the 1960s and become unsafe. The field received artificial turf in 2017. The only remaining part of the original venue is the equipment shed at the northwest corner of the facility.

In addition to football, the field has hosted soccer matches. Until 2004, the Green Bay East and Green Bay Preble soccer programs shared the field for their home games.

References

Further reading
 Cameron, Steve. The Packers!. Dallas, Tex.: Taylor Pub. Co., 1993.

Defunct National Football League venues
Green Bay Packers stadiums
High school football venues in the United States
Sports venues in Green Bay, Wisconsin
American football venues in Wisconsin
1925 establishments in Wisconsin
Sports venues completed in 1925
Soccer venues in Wisconsin
Packers Heritage Trail
Education in Green Bay, Wisconsin